The Denbigh Arms is a former pub at 3 Denbigh Place, Pimlico, London SW1.

It is a Grade II listed building, built in the mid 19th century. The pub closed in 1998 and the building is now a private house.

References

External links
 

Grade II listed pubs in the City of Westminster
Former pubs in London
Pimlico